Xinshi (unless otherwise indicated , lit. "New City") may refer to the following locations in mainland China and Taiwan:

Districts
Xinshi District, Baoding, Hebei
Xinshi District, Ürümqi, Xinjiang

Subdistricts
Xinshi Subdistrict, Shijiazhuang, in Qiaoxi District, Shijiazhuang, Hebei
Xinshi Subdistrict, Jinhua, in Wucheng District, Jinhua, Zhejiang
Xinshi Subdistrict, Guangzhou, in Baiyun District
Xinshi Subdistrict, Linjiang, Jilin
Xinshi Subdistrict, Xi'an, in Lintong District

Towns
Xinshi, in Bowang District, Ma'anshan, Anhui
Xinshi, Changshou District, Chongqing
Xinshi, Zaoyang, Xiangyang, Hubei
Xinshi, Jingshan County, Jingmen, Hubei
Xinshi (新市镇), Leiyang City, Hengyang, Hunan.
Xinshi, Miluo, Yueyang, Hunan
Xinshi, You County, Hunan
Xinshi, Mianzhu, Sichuan
Xinshi, Ziyang, in Jianyang, Sichuan
Xinshi, Yibin, in Pingshan County, Sichuan
Xinshi, Huzhou, in Deqing County, Zhejiang

Townships
Xinshi Township, Qu County, Sichuan

See also
Sinshih District, Tainan, Taiwan